Wild World of Spike is a television series that aired Thursdays on Spike about extreme sports. The three hosts, two of whom are athletes themselves, watch these from a couch on the set. They then recreate stunts.

Episode list
Episode 1: Episode #1.1
Original Air Date: January 6, 2007
Episode 2: Polar Plunge
Original Air Date: January 4, 2007
Episode 3: Testicle Weightlifting
Original Air Date: January 18, 2007
Episode 4: Log Boxing
Original Air Date: January 25, 2007
Episode 5: Taser
Original Air Date: February 2, 2007
Episode 6: Stripper Dodgeball
Original Air Date: February 9, 2007
Episode 7: Tony Hawk Tag Team
Original Air Date: February 16, 2007
Episode 8: Harley Hotdog
Original Air Date: April 5, 2007
Episode 9: Peanut Butter Paintball
Original Air Date: April 12, 2007
Episode 10: Pudding Wrestling: Christy Hemme guests
Original Air Date: April 19, 2007
Episode 11: Hip Hop Snowmobile
Original Air Date: April 26, 2007
Episode 12: Rampage Jackson
Original Air Date: May 3, 2007
Episode 13: Amateur Pole Dancing/Porn Star Bowling (featuring Glee star Naya Rivera, who was 20 years old at the time)
Original Air Date: May 10, 2007
Episode 14: Anti-Ninja Training
Original Air Date: May 17, 2007

References

External links

2007 American television series debuts
2007 American television series endings
Spike (TV network) original programming
American sports television series